Schlemmer may refer to:

People with the surname
Ferdinand Louis Schlemmer (1892–1947), American artist
Hans Schlemmer (1893–1973), general of the mountain troops in the Wehrmacht during World War II
Max Schlemmer, Maximilian "Max" Joseph August Schlemmer (1856–1935), known as the "King of Laysan", German immigrant to the United States of America
Oskar Schlemmer (1888–1943), German painter, sculptor, designer and choreographer associated with the Bauhaus school
Raymond Schlemmer was a seminal figure in the early history of Scouting in France, from 1922 to 1952. In late 1937, French Scouting sent Scoutmaster Schlemmer.
Sebastian Schlemmer (born 1978), German actor and well known for his role of Sebastian von Lahnstein in the soap opera Verbotene Liebe (Forbidden Love)

Other uses
Schlemmer v. Buffalo, Rochester & Pittsburgh Railway Co. 205 U.S. 1 (1907) was a cause of action for the death of the plaintiff's intestate, Adam M. Schlemmer
Hammacher Schlemmer, an American catalog founded in 1848